Kim Hye-rin (Hangul: 김혜린; born 19 May 1995) is a South Korean badminton player. In 2013, she won the mixed doubles title at the Romanian International tournament partnered with Choi Sol-gyu. In 2017, she won the silver medal at the Asia Championships in the women's doubles event.

Achievements

Asian Championships 
Women's doubles

BWF World Tour (1 title, 3 runners-up) 
The BWF World Tour, which was announced on 19 March 2017 and implemented in 2018, is a series of elite badminton tournaments sanctioned by the Badminton World Federation (BWF). The BWF World Tour is divided into levels of World Tour Finals, Super 1000, Super 750, Super 500, Super 300 (part of the HSBC World Tour), and the BWF Tour Super 100.

Women's doubles

BWF Superseries (1 runner-up) 
The BWF Superseries, which was launched on 14 December 2006 and implemented in 2007, was a series of elite badminton tournaments, sanctioned by the Badminton World Federation (BWF). BWF Superseries levels were Superseries and Superseries Premier. A season of Superseries consisted of twelve tournaments around the world that had been introduced since 2011. Successful players were invited to the Superseries Finals, which were held at the end of each year.

Women's doubles

  BWF Superseries Premier tournament
  BWF Superseries tournament

BWF Grand Prix (1 runner-up) 
The BWF Grand Prix had two levels, the Grand Prix and Grand Prix Gold. It was a series of badminton tournaments sanctioned by the Badminton World Federation (BWF) and played between 2007 and 2017.

Women's doubles

  BWF Grand Prix Gold tournament
  BWF Grand Prix tournament

BWF International Challenge/Series (1 title, 2 runners-up) 
Women's doubles

Mixed doubles

  BWF International Challenge tournament
  BWF International Series tournament

References

External links 
 

1995 births
Living people
People from Changwon
South Korean female badminton players
Badminton players at the 2018 Asian Games
Asian Games competitors for South Korea
Sportspeople from South Gyeongsang Province